Patrick Biggs (born 11 October 1982) is a Canadian alpine skier.

Born in Berwick, Australia, Biggs has twice finished in the top 10 in the slalom at World Cup events, both in 2005 and has won multiple medals at the Canadian championships in slalom. He participated in the 2006 Olympics, finishing 10th in the first run, but failing to finish the second. He has also competed in two Alpine Skiing World Championships, ending up 9th in the slalom on both occasions, in 2005 and 2007

References

External links
FIS biography
Official website

1982 births
Living people
Olympic alpine skiers of Canada
Alpine skiers at the 2006 Winter Olympics
Canadian male alpine skiers
Skiers from Melbourne
Australian emigrants to Canada
People from Berwick, Victoria